Tekitha Washington is a Wu-Tang Clan-affiliated female vocalist who was the Wu-Tang Clan's in-house singer (previously filled by Blue Raspberry) for the album Wu-Tang Forever, on which she also performed a solo track titled "Second Coming". She also filled in for the unavailable Mary J. Blige in the video for Ghostface Killah's "All That I Got Is You".

Initially signed to RZA's Razor Sharp Records and then to Ghostface's Starks Enterprise, Tekitha continued to make guest appearances on Wu-Tang projects such as Raekwon's The Lex Diamond Story and has also collaborated with non-Wu artists including KRS-One and Armand Van Helden. While usually heard singing, her rapping can be heard on Cappadonna's "Pump Your Fist" and RZA's "Mantis".

Tekitha released her debut solo six song EP "The Prelude" in 2010.  "The Prelude" featured all new original songs by Tekitha, with production from The RZA, Armand Van Helden, Bdotforealla of The Ahficionados and Jeff Jones/Joneszilla. The project was executive produced by Tekitha, The RZA and Jeff Jones under her new label Wisdom Body Entertainment distributed by Sony\The Orchard.

Tekitha and RZA have a daughter, Prana Supreme Diggs, born in 2001, with whom she has created a country act, O.N.E The Duo.

Discography

Albums 
 The Prelude  January 19, 2010
 Wisdom Body LP (not released)
Week of the Phoenix (2019)

Songs 
"Walking Through the Darkness", Ghost Dog: The Way of the Samurai (soundtrack, 1999)
 "You" (2002)
 "You (Remix)" (featuring Ghostface Killah, 2002)
 "I Love U So" (2002)
 "Fantasy"
 "I Can See" (featuring Cappadonna)
 "Wut U Got" (Production Dub the Director for IDH rec)
 "Dreamz"
 "Ridin'"
 "Chea" (Production Dub the Director for IDH rec)
 "On It" (Produced by Jeff Jones/Joneszilla. Lead Single from The Prelude)
 "Emotional" featuring Torae (Lead single from Week of the Phoenix. Produced by Ahmed Soultan).

Guest appearances 
 Wu-Tang Forever (Wu-Tang Clan album, 1997)
 "Impossible"
 "Second Coming" (solo)
 "Heaterz" (Background Vocalist)
 Heavy Mental (Killah Priest album, 1998)
 "One Step"
 The Pillage (Cappadonna album, 1998)
 "Pump Your Fist" (rapping)
 "Black Boy"
 Heist of the Century (La the Darkman album, 1998)
 "Street Life"
 Bobby Digital in Stereo (RZA as Bobby Digital album, 1998)
 "Mantis" (rapping)
 2 Future 4 U (Armand Van Helden album, 1998)
 "Mother Earth"
 Antidote (Deadly Venoms album, 1998)
 "Ready"
 Manchild (Shyheim album, 1999)
 "Manchild"
 Ghost Dog: The Way of the Samurai (RZA album, 2000)
 "Walking Through the Darkness"
 Killing Puritans (Armand Van Helden album, 2000)
 "Conscience"
 Digital Bullet (RZA as Bobby Digital album, 2001)
 "Build Strong"
 Bulletproof Wallets (Ghostface Killah album, 2001)
 "Walking Through the Darkness"
 The Lex Diamond Story (Raekwon album, 2003)
 "Once Upon A Time"
 Kristyles (KRS-One album, 2003)
 "Survivin'"
 Pismo (Within Transition album 2006)
 "Lucid"
 Kaleidoscope (DJ Okawari album)
 "Kaleidoscope"
 "All That I Got Is You (Video Version)", Ghostface Killah (1997)
 "Street Opera", Killah Priest (1997)
 "Soul in the Hole", Wu-Tang Killa Bees, Soul in the Hole soundtrack (1998)
 "Children of the Heavens" (Shaka Amazulu The 7th)

References

External links 

Tekitha's Official Website
Tekitha on Myspace
 Wu-International Interview: Wisdom Body

African-American women singers
American women rappers
American hip hop singers
Living people
Wu-Tang Clan affiliates
American neo soul singers
1972 births
21st-century American women singers
21st-century American rappers
21st-century American singers
21st-century women rappers